The 2018 World Surf League Championship Tour (CT) is a professional competitive surfing league run by the World Surf League, starting on 11 March 2018. Men and women compete in separate tours with events taking place from late March to mid-December, at various surfing locations around the world.

Surfers receive points for their best events. The surfer with the most points at the end of the tour (after discarding their two worst results) is announced the 2018 World Surf League Champion.

2018 Championship Tour

Event Results

2018 Men's Championship Tour Jeep Leaderboard 
Points are awarded using the following structure:

 Championship Tour surfers best 9 of 11 results are combined to equal their final point total.
 Tournament results discarded
Legend

Source

2018 Women's Championship Tour Jeep Leaderboard 

Points are awarded using the following structure:

 Championship Tour surfers best 8 of 10 results are combined to equal their final point total.
 Tournament results discarded

Legend

Source

Qualifying Series

Men's Qualifying Series 

Legend

Source

2018 Women's Qualifying Series 

Legend

Source

References

External links

 
World Surf League
World League